Galatia is a city in Barton County, Kansas, United States.  As of the 2020 census, the population of the city was 45.

History
Settler David C. Barrows founded the community and laid out the town site in 1885. Originally named Four Corners, settler Henry G. Weber renamed it Galatia after his hometown of Galatia, Illinois. The first building constructed was a United Brethren church. A post office was established at Galatia in 1889. The Atchison, Topeka and Santa Fe Railway extended a rail line to Galatia (from Holyrood 31.20 miles away) on July 1, 1919, and the town grew to include three grain elevators, a bank, a lumberyard, and three general stores. By 1921, the population had grown to 202. After that, however, the population began to decline. The post office closed in 1966.

Geography

Demographics

2010 census
As of the census of 2010, there were 39 people, 20 households, and 12 families residing in the city. The racial makeup of the city was 100.0% White. Hispanic or Latino of any race were 7.7% of the population.

There were 20 households, of which 10.0% had children under the age of 18 living with them, 50.0% were married couples living together, 5.0% had a female householder with no husband present, 5.0% had a male householder with no wife present, and 40.0% were non-families. 40.0% of all households were made up of individuals, and 10% had someone living alone who was 65 years of age or older. The average household size was 1.95 and the average family size was 2.58.

The median age in the city was 56.3 years. 12.8% of residents were under the age of 18; 7.7% were between the ages of 18 and 24; 7.8% were from 25 to 44; 43.6% were from 45 to 64; and 28.2% were 65 years of age or older. The gender makeup of the city was 64.1% male and 35.9% female.

2000 census
As of the census of 2000, there were 61 people, 27 households, and 18 families residing in the city. The racial makeup of the city was 83.61% White and 16.39% Native American.

There were 27 households, out of which 18.5% had children under the age of 18 living with them, 55.6% were married couples living together, 3.7% had a female householder with no husband present, and 33.3% were non-families. 29.6% of all households were made up of individuals, and 18.5% had someone living alone who was 65 years of age or older. The average household size was 2.26 and the average family size was 2.83.

In the city, the population was spread out, with 23.0% under the age of 18, 6.6% from 18 to 24, 26.2% from 25 to 44, 18.0% from 45 to 64, and 26.2% who were 65 years of age or older. The median age was 41 years. For every 100 females, there were 125.9 males. For every 100 females age 18 and over, there were 104.3 males.

The median income for a household in the city was $28,750, and the median income for a family was $38,750. Males had a median income of $22,188 versus $31,250 for females. The per capita income for the city was $16,282. There were no families and 6.0% of the population living below the poverty line, including no under eighteens and none of those over 64.

Government
Galatia is a city of the third class with a mayor-council form of government. The city council consists of five members, and it meets on the first Tuesday of each month.

Galatia lies within Kansas's 1st U.S. Congressional District. For the purposes of representation in the Kansas Legislature, the city is located in the 33rd district of the Kansas Senate and the 109th district of the Kansas House of Representatives.

Education
The community is served by Hoisington USD 431 public school district, based in nearby Hoisington.

Galatia High School was closed through school unification. The Galatia High School mascot was Bluejays.

Media
Galatia is in the Wichita-Hutchinson, Kansas television market.

Infrastructure

Transportation
NW 190 Road, a paved county road, runs east–west through Galatia. Another paved county road, NW 100 Avenue, runs north–south through the community.

The Atchison, Topeka and Santa Fe Railway formerly operated a freight rail line that ran east–west through Galatia, but the line has since been discontinued.

References

Further reading

External links
 Galatia - Directory of Public Officials
 Galatia city map, KDOT

Cities in Kansas
Cities in Barton County, Kansas